Daniel Day Williams (1910 – December, 1973) was a process theologian, professor, and author.  He served on the joint faculty of the University of Chicago and the Chicago Theological Seminary, and later at Union Theological Seminary in New York City.  Williams was a member of the United Church of Christ.

Works
 God's Grace and Man's Hope, Harper & Row, 1949 (Rauschenbush Lectureship), reprint 1965,  online edition
 What Present-Day Theologians Are Thinking, Harper & Brothers, 1952, revised ed. 1959, 3rd ed. 1967, Greenwood Publications revised ed. 1978: 
 Basic Christian Affirmations, National Council of Churches, 1953
 Christian Teaching and Christian Beliefs, United Church Board for Homeland Ministries, 1955
 The Advancement of Theological Education, with H. Richard Niebuhr and James Gustafson, Harper & Brothers, 1955, published online as  The Purpose of the Church and its Ministry
 The Ministry in Historical Perspectives, edited with H. Richard Niebuhr, Harper & Brothers, 1956, online edition
 The Family Learns About Jesus, Pilgrim Press, 1960
 The Minister and the Care of Souls, Harper, 1961, online edition
 The New Life in Christ: The meaning and experience of continuing redemption, 1965
 Spirit and the Forms of Love, Harper & Row, 1968, University Press of America 1981 reprint,  online edition
 The Andover Liberals;: A Study in American Theology, Octagon Press, 1970
 Essays in Process Theology, edited with Perry D. LeFevre, Exploration Press 1985, 

1910 births
1973 deaths
20th-century American theologians
Process theologians
American Congregationalists
United Church of Christ members
United Church of Christ ministers
University of Chicago alumni
Chicago Theological Seminary alumni
Union Theological Seminary (New York City) alumni